Oleksandr Kozhemyachenko (born December 29, 1978) is a Ukrainian former professional footballer. He spent most of his career with Desna Chernihiv.

Career

Desna Chernihiv
Kozhemyachenko started his career at Desna Chernihiv, from  1998 until 2002, where he played 85 games and scored 31 goals. He made his debut on May 3, 1999, against Zaporizhia's Torpedo.

After a brief spell away, he returned to Desna Chernihiv in 2002,. He won the 2005–06 Ukrainian Second League with the club and won the league's golden boot with 21 goals. in 2004–05 with 20 goals By the time he left Desna in 2012, he was the club all-time leading scorer with 128 goals in all competitions.

Avangard Korukivka
In 2012, he moved to Avangard Korukivka, where he won Chernihiv Oblast Football Championship and the Chernihiv Oblast Football Cup in 2013.

Honours
Desna Chernihiv
 Ukrainian Second League: 2005–06

FC Avanhard Koriukivka 
 Chernihiv Oblast Football Championship: 2013
 Chernihiv Oblast Football Cup: 2013

Individual
 Top Scorer Ukrainian Second League: 2010–11 (12 goals)
 Top Scorer Ukrainian Second League: 2004–05 (20 goals)
 Top Scorer Ukrainian Second League: 2005–06 (21 goals)
 Desna Chernihiv Player of the Year: (4) 2004, 2005, 2006, 2011

References

External links 
Profile on website 

1978 births
Living people
Footballers from Chernihiv
Ukrainian footballers
FC Desna Chernihiv players
FC Sokil Zolochiv players
FC Avanhard Koriukivka players
Ukrainian First League players
Ukrainian Second League players
Association football forwards